Nasiruddin Faruque is a first-class and List A cricketer from Bangladesh. He was born on 31 August 1983 and is a left-handed batsman. He made his debut for Barisal Division in 2003/04 and played through the 2006/07 season. He has also represented Bangladesh A from 2003/04 to 2006/07 and Bangladesh Under-23s in 2003/04.

He has scored 2 first-class hundreds, with a highest knock of 141 against Sylhet Division and 6 fifties. His only one day hundred to date, 115, was scored against the same team.

References

Bangladeshi cricketers
Barisal Division cricketers
Living people
Gazi Group cricketers
Kala Bagan Krira Chakra cricketers
Dhaka Division cricketers
Bangladesh under-23 cricketers
1983 births